The Elam Drake House is a historic house in Columbus, Ohio, United States. The house was listed on the National Register of Historic Places in 1978. The two-story brick building was constructed in 1856. It features a one-story north end, built in 1856, with a 1.5-story addition to the south, built between 1856 and 1857. The farmstead, including a barn, summer kitchen, and smoke house, was built by a Elam Drake, a former brick layer and plasterer who retired to take up farming in 1856. The site stands as an example of farmstead structures typical of the 19th century.

See also
 National Register of Historic Places listings in Columbus, Ohio

References

Houses completed in 1856
National Register of Historic Places in Columbus, Ohio
Houses in Columbus, Ohio
Houses on the National Register of Historic Places in Ohio